Gülbahar Hatun (1453 –  1505), also known as Ayşe Hatun was a consort of Sultan Bayezid II and the mother of Sultan Selim I of the Ottoman Empire and the grandmother of Sultan Suleiman the Magnificent.

Names 
One of the oldest references Cenabî History gives her name as Ayşe Hatun. According to Sicill-i Osmanî her name is Gülbahar Hatun, while Alderson gives her name as Ayşe Hatun, as well.

Origins 
Gülbahar Hatun and Ayşe Hatun were never different women. The theory of Gülbahar Hatun's origins make her a different woman from Ayşe Hatun as both women had same maiden name, Ayşe in both the origins and were also married in the same year. The theories of her background are:

 The Ottoman inscription (vakfiye) describes her as Hātun binti Abd-us-Samed (Daughter of Abd-us-Samed), which supports the view that she was a non Muslim who later converted to Islam. Abd-us-Samed, meaning Servant of God, was the anonym that was applied to many Balkan and Anatolian Christians who converted to Islam in the classical Ottoman period.
 This origin is also described for Emine Gülbahar Hatun, wife of Mehmed the Conqueror, mother of Sultan Bayezid II and the grandmother of Sultan Selim I.

 According to another view, she was the daughter of Alaüddevle Bozkurt Bey, the eleventh ruler of the Dulkadirids centered around Elbistan in Kahramanmaraş. Her real name was Ayşe and was renamed Gülbahar after her marriage.

 A third view is that she was a Pontic Greek from the village of Vayvara (south of Sumela Monastery), in the district of Maçka. Şakir Şevket, chronicler of Trabzon, writes that the income from Vakfikebir and Vakfısagir taxes were donated to the Hatuniye Külliyesi, and that the revenues collected from the thirty-two plateaus of Maçka were distributed among the staff and kitchen of this kulliye. Şakir Şevket explains the aforementioned as: "The aforesaid girl is originally Greek, and that is why she is described as a Greek princess on her mausoleum. It is told that she has been taken by Fatih and wedded to Sultan Bayezid, she was the daughter of a Christian man in the village of Vayvara.". Necdet Sakaoğlu states based on this: "We understand from this explanation that she was captured during the conquest of Trabzon and given to Bayezid.". Halil Edhem Bey in the "Vâlide-i Sultan Selim-i Evvel Gülbahâr Hâtun Mausoleum, year 911" section of his article, "Ottoman Epigraphs in Trabzon", quotes the inscription on her tomb, which is told to be written by her son, Sultan Selim I: "May Bânû-yi Rûm, who has turned her face from the world towards eternity, sit on the throne of Heaven and may God bless her.". The year of death written on the last lines is 911 AH (1505 AD). Necdet Sakaoğlu writes: "There are no Islamic wishes or prayers on this epigraph of six verses, written in Persian rather than Arabic. It is mentioned that the person lying in the mausoleum is a Greek princess (Banû-yi Rum).".

Life 
Bayezid married her in 1469 at Amasya. When Bayezid was still a şehzade ("Ottoman prince") and the governor of Amasya sanjak when she gave birth to Selim I in 1470. When Mehmed the Conqueror died in 1481, Bayezid moved to Constantinople, the capital of the Ottoman Empire, along with his family to ascend the throne.

According to Turkish tradition, all princes were expected to work as provincial governors (Sanjak-bey) as a part of their training. Mothers of princes were responsible for the proper behaviour of their sons in their provincial posts. In 1495 was sent to Trabzon sanjak and then in 1511 to Samandıra, and Gülbahar accompanied him.

However, she herself never became recognized as a Valide Hatun because she died in 1505 before Selim's accession to the throne. Her tomb is located in Gülbahar Hatun Mosque, Trabzon. It was built in 1514 in honour of his mother and was restored in 1885.

See also
Ottoman Empire
Ottoman family tree
Ottoman dynasty
Line of succession to the Ottoman throne
Ottoman Emperors family tree (simplified)

References

1453 births
1505 deaths
15th-century consorts of Ottoman sultans
16th-century consorts of Ottoman sultans